Oașa Dam is a large dam on the river Sebeș in Romania.

The project was started and finished in the 1980s and it was made up by the construction of a reinforced concrete facing rockfilled dam 91 m high.

The Gâlceag hydropower plant is equipped with two turbines, having an installed capacity of 150 MW.

The power station generates 260 GWh of electricity per year.

External links

Description 

Hydroelectric power stations in Romania
Dams in Romania